Cafferata is a surname. Notable people with the surname include:

Ana Maria Brescia Cafferata (born c. 1924), Peruvian billionaire heiress
Hector A. Cafferata Jr. (1929–2016), American Marine and Medal of Honor recipient
Juan Manuel Cafferata (1852–1920), Argentine politician 
Mario Brescia Cafferata (1929–2013), Peruvian billionaire businessman
Patricia Dillon Cafferata (born 1940), American politician
Pedro Brescia Cafferata (1921–2014), Peruvian businessman
Raymond Cafferata (1897–1966), British Police Officer, see 1929 Hebron massacre
Rosa Brescia Cafferata (born c. 1926), Peruvian billionaire heiress and philanthropist